The fifth season of Law & Order aired on NBC between September 21, 1994, and May 24, 1995.

Critic Alan Sepinwall considers the season's casting lineup to be the best out of all the seasons of Law & Order.

Cast
Jack McCoy (played by Sam Waterston) replaced season 4's Ben Stone (Michael Moriarty) as Executive Assistant District Attorney. Mike Logan (played by Chris Noth) departed the cast after this season, thus making Adam Schiff (played by Steven Hill) the last remaining first-season cast member.

Main cast
Jerry Orbach as Senior Detective Lennie Briscoe
Chris Noth as Junior Detective Det. Mike Logan
S. Epatha Merkerson as Lieutenant Anita Van Buren
Sam Waterston as Executive Assistant District Attorney Jack McCoy
Jill Hennessy as Assistant District Attorney Claire Kincaid
Steven Hill as District Attorney Adam Schiff

Recurring cast
Dann Florek as Captain Don Cragen
Carolyn McCormick as Dr. Elizabeth Olivet

Departure of Chris Noth
Chris Noth, who played Junior Detective Mike Logan, left the series at the end of the 5th season thus making Steven Hill the last first-season member. But he reprised his role in the TV movie Exiled: A Law & Order Movie in 1998, and on Law & Order: Criminal Intent from 2005 till 2008.

Episodes

Critical reception
Alan Sepinwall wrote in TV (The Book) that the casting lineup in season 5 was the best out of all the seasons of Law & Order, stating that it was "[t]he '27 Yankees of L&O casts, featuring not only Hall of Famers at every position but the very best example of each respective role in the franchise's history."

References

External links
Episode guide from NBC.com

05
1994 American television seasons
1995 American television seasons